Sanxia Prison is a prison in the municipality of Chongqing, China. It was established in 2004.

See also
List of prisons in Chongqing municipality

References
Laogai Research Foundation Handbook

Prisons in Chongqing
Government buildings completed in 2004